Lates lakdiva is a species of ray-finned fish from the family Latidae, which is only known to occur in western Sri Lanka. It is similar to the barramundi, but its body is not as deep. It is a species of fresh and brackish waters.

References

lakdiva
Taxa named by Rohan Pethiyagoda
Taxa named by Anthony C. Gill
Fish described in 2012